The Hanson-Downing House is a historic house in Kearney, Nebraska. It was built in 1886 as a cottage orné by Charles E. Hanson, a Swedish immigrant. It later belonged to Wallace A. Downing, a businessman in the saddlery and harness industry. Since December 1930, it has housed the Kearney Woman's Club. It has been listed on the National Register of Historic Places since December 10, 1980.

References

Cottage orné
National Register of Historic Places in Buffalo County, Nebraska
Houses completed in 1886